Hanna is a small unincorporated community in Lawrence County, South Dakota, United States.  It is located along the Hanna Road in the Black Hills of South Dakota.  The small settlement or village is south of the Hanna Campground and west-southwest of the Lead Country Club.  The community is located about twelve miles southwest of Lead, South Dakota.

History
Hanna was founded in 1904. It was named in honor of a United States Senator, Marc Hanna of Ohio, who died shortly before the community was founded. At one time, a branch of the Chicago, Burlington & Quincy Railroad ran through the town. The community now contains a pumping station for the Homestake Mine.

Geography
Hanna is located at (44.261667, -103.844722).

Climate

References

External links
 Hanna, South Dakota profile
 Hanna Campground

Unincorporated communities in Lawrence County, South Dakota
Populated places established in 1904
Unincorporated communities in South Dakota